is a railway station on the Nemuro Main Line of JR Hokkaido located in Minamifurano, Hokkaidō, Japan.

The station, which first opened on 6 December 1902, was used as the fictional Horomai Station (幌舞駅) in Yasuo Furuhata's 1999 film Poppoya. The station building still displays a signboard reading Horomai, not Ikutora, over the front entrance.

Adjacent stations 
Hokkaido Railway Company
Nemuro Main Line
 T35 – Ikutora T36 – Ochiai T37

Railway stations in Hokkaido Prefecture
Railway stations in Japan opened in 1902